Guernsey competed in the 2014 Commonwealth Games in Glasgow, Scotland from 23 July to 3 August 2014.

Athletics

Men

Women

Badminton

Mixed team

Pool C

Cycling

Mountain biking

Road
Men

Women

Judo

Men

Shooting
Men

Women

Swimming

Men

Women

References

Nations at the 2014 Commonwealth Games
Guernsey at the Commonwealth Games
2014 in Guernsey